Leucadendron bonum, the Gideonskop conebush, is a flower-bearing shrub that belongs to the genus Leucadendron and forms part of the fynbos. The plant is native to the Western Cape, South Africa.

Description
The shrub grows  and bears flowers in October.

Distribution and habitat
The plant occurs in the Kouebokkeveld Mountains near Gideonskop.

References

 http://redlist.sanbi.org/species.php?species=794-11
 https://www.proteaatlas.org.za/conebu11.htm
 http://www.biodiversityexplorer.info/plants/proteaceae/leucadendron_bonum.htm

bonum
Flora of the Cape Provinces